Péter Molnár (born 16 February 1986) is a Hungarian canoeist who had his best achievements in two-men and four-men events, partnering with Sándor Tótka. Together they won a world title in 2015 and a European title in 2016 and placed fourth at the 2016 Olympics. Individually Molnár won silver medals at the 2008 and 2011 European Championships and placed 15th at the 2016 Olympics.

References

External links

 

1986 births
Living people
Hungarian male canoeists
Olympic canoeists of Hungary
Canoeists at the 2016 Summer Olympics
People from Vác
ICF Canoe Sprint World Championships medalists in kayak
Canoeists at the 2015 European Games
European Games medalists in canoeing
European Games bronze medalists for Hungary
Sportspeople from Pest County
20th-century Hungarian people
21st-century Hungarian people